Atlantis Rising is a concept album released by heavy metal band Manilla Road in 2001. Its content revolves around the lost continent of Atlantis re-emerging and the resulting war between the Æsir and Great Old Ones over the continent.

Track listing
 "Megalodon" - 8:20
 "Lemuria" - 2:50
 "Atlantis Rising" - 7:01
 "Sea Witch" - 4:29
 "Resurrection" - 6:38
 "Decimation" - 6:38
 "Flight of the Ravens" - 2:11
 "March of the Gods" - 5:09
 "Siege of Atland" - 4:53
 "War of the Gods" - 8:49

Credits
 Mark Shelton - guitars and vocals
 Scott Peters - drums and drum arrangements
 Bryan Patrick - vocals, drum arrangements (drums on "Sea Witch")
 Mark Anderson - bass guitars and six-string classic guitar
 Darby Michael Pentecost - vocals (title track "Atlantis Rising")

References

 

Concept albums
Manilla Road albums
2001 albums